Wicked Woman may refer to:
 A Wicked Woman, a 1934 film
 Wicked Woman (film), a 1953 film 
 Wicked Woman (album), a bootleg recording of Janet Joplin's last concert, 1970

See also 
Wicked Women, a collection of short stories by Fay Weldon